Joachim-Friedrich Huth (31 July 1896 – 27 March 1962) was a German general in the  during World War II and the Air Force of the  in West Germany.

Biography
He was injured three times. He was severely injured on 23 March 1918, losing his right lower leg. Huth was awarded both classes of the Iron Cross (1914) and the Knight's Cross to the House Order of Hohenzollern with Swords during the war.

Huth left the military service after the war. The treaty of Versailles had imposed severe restrictions on Germany's military strength and had denied Germany an air force. Huth earned the Knight's Cross of the Iron Cross on 11 September 1940 in this position for the successful leadership of his fighter wing in the Battle of France and Battle of Britain.

He held this position until the end of the war, when he was taken prisoner by the British forces. He was released in 1946.

Awards
 Iron Cross (1914) 2nd and 1st Class
 Knight's Cross to the House Order of Hohenzollern with Swords

References

Citations

Bibliography

 
 
 

1896 births
1962 deaths
Recipients of the Knight's Cross of the Iron Cross
Luftstreitkräfte personnel
Luftwaffe World War II generals
Bundeswehr generals
German amputees
People from the Province of Saxony
People from Altmarkkreis Salzwedel
German prisoners of war in World War II held by the United Kingdom
Prussian Army personnel
German Army  personnel of World War I
Lieutenant generals of the German Air Force
Recipients of the clasp to the Iron Cross, 1st class
Lieutenant generals of the Luftwaffe
Military personnel from Saxony-Anhalt